The 2021 Newfoundland and Labrador general election was held on March 25, 2021, to elect members of the 50th General Assembly of Newfoundland and Labrador.

Under the province's fixed election date law, the vote was tentatively scheduled for October 10, 2023, but a caveat in the law mandates that an election must be held within one year of a new Premier assuming office. Premier Furey assumed the role on August 19, 2020, and requested to Lieutenant Governor Judy Foote to issue the writs of election on January 15, 2021.

However, an unexpected COVID-19 surge in the week leading up to the election caused voting to be delayed on the Avalon Peninsula, before all in-person voting was eventually cancelled, delaying the election for every district until March 1, 2021. After several more delays, the final mail-in ballot deadline became March 25, 2021. The election was the first mail-in-only election in Canada. Preliminary results were released by noon on March 27, which projected a majority government for Andrew Furey and the Liberal Party.

With 48.24% of eligible voters casting a ballot, this election had the lowest turnout of any provincial election since confederation.

Results

|- style="background:#ccc;"
! rowspan="2" colspan="2" style="text-align:left;"|Party
! rowspan="2" style="text-align:left;"|Party leader
!rowspan="2"|Candidates
! colspan="4" style="text-align:center;"|Seats
! colspan="3" style="text-align:center;"|Popular vote
|- style="background:#eee;"
| style="text-align:center;"|2019
| style="text-align:center;"|Dissol.
| style="text-align:center;"|2021
| style="text-align:center;"|Change
| style="text-align:center;"|#
| style="text-align:center;"|%
| style="text-align:center;"|+/-

| style="text-align:left;" |Andrew Furey
| style="text-align:right;" |40
| style="text-align:right;" |20
| style="text-align:right;" |19
| style="text-align:right;" |22
| style="text-align:right;" |2
| style="text-align:right;" |86,180
| style="text-align:right;" |48.24
| style="text-align:right;" |4.24

| style="text-align:left;" |Ches Crosbie
| style="text-align:right;" |40
| style="text-align:right;" |15
| style="text-align:right;" |15
| style="text-align:right;" |13
| style="text-align:right;" |2
| style="text-align:right;" |69,314
| style="text-align:right;" |38.80
| style="text-align:right;" |3.76

| style="text-align:left;" |Alison Coffin
| style="text-align:right;" |33
| style="text-align:right;" |3
| style="text-align:right;" |3
| style="text-align:right;" |2
| style="text-align:right;" |1
| style="text-align:right;" |14,324
| style="text-align:right;" |8.02
| style="text-align:right;" |1.71

| style="text-align:left;" |Graydon Pelley
| style="text-align:right;" |6
| style="text-align:right;" |0
| style="text-align:right;" |0
| style="text-align:right;" |0
| style="text-align:right;" |0
| style="text-align:right;" |557
| style="text-align:right;" |0.31
| style="text-align:right;" |2.08

| style="text-align:left;" colspan="2"|Independents
| style="text-align:right;" |8
| style="text-align:right;" |2
| style="text-align:right;" |3
| style="text-align:right;" |3
| style="text-align:right;" |1
| style="text-align:right;" |8,257
| style="text-align:right;" |4.62
| style="text-align:right;" |0.12
|-
| style="text-align:left;" colspan="3"|Invalid votes
| style="text-align:right;"| –
| style="text-align:right;"| –
| style="text-align:right;"| –
| style="text-align:right;"| –
| style="text-align:right;"|-
| style="text-align:right;"|
| style="text-align:right;"|-
| style="text-align:right;"|-
|-
| style="text-align:left;" colspan="3"|Total
| style="text-align:right;"|127
| style="text-align:right;"|40
| style="text-align:right;"|40
| style="text-align:right;"|40
| style="text-align:right;"|-
| style="text-align:right;"|178,632
| style="text-align:right;"|100
| style="text-align:right;"|-
|-
| style="text-align:left;" colspan="3"|Registered voters/turnout
| style="text-align:right;"| –
| style="text-align:right;"| –
| style="text-align:right;"| –
| style="text-align:right;"| –
| style="text-align:right;"|-
| style="text-align:right;"|
| style="text-align:right;"|
| style="text-align:right;"|-
|}

Historical results from 1993 onwards

Synopsis of results

 = open seat
 = turnout is above provincial average
 = incumbent re-elected in same riding
 = incumbent changed allegiance
 = other incumbent renominated

Ridings changing hands

Four ridings changed their allegiance from 2019:

 Liberal to Independent

 Lake Melville

 PC to Liberal

 Mount Pearl North
 Windsor Lake

 NDP to Liberal

 St. John's East-Quidi Vidi

Incumbents not running for reelection
The following MHAs had announced that they would not be running in this provincial election:

Liberal
Carol Anne Haley (Burin-Grand Bank)
Christopher Mitchelmore (St. Barbe-L'Anse aux Meadows)

Progressive Conservative
Kevin Parsons (Cape St. Francis)

Timeline

2019
 May 16, 2019 – The Liberal Party of Newfoundland and Labrador wins 20 of the 40 seats in the House of Assembly during the general election, re-electing Premier Dwight Ball but forcing the Liberals to form a minority government. This is the first time the province elected a minority government since 1971.
 May 30, 2019 – Premier Ball's cabinet is sworn in; all ministers maintain their previous portfolios with the exception of MHA Warr entering cabinet.
 September 13, 2019 – Minister Trimper resigns from cabinet after comments critical of the Innu Nation were left on the voicemail of an Innu Nation staffer and publicly revealed.
 September 13, 2019 – MHA Bragg is appointed Minister of Municipal Affairs and Environment replacing Trimper.
 December 5, 2019 – The House of Assembly votes to reprimand Minister Chris Mitchelmore for his hiring of Carla Foote at The Rooms despite her lack of qualifications and her political connections to the Liberals. The House of Assembly ordered that Mitchelmore apologize to the Board of Directors of The Rooms, to the House of Assembly, and also be suspended two-week without pay.

2020
 February 17, 2020 – Dwight Ball announces that he will be resigning as Premier of Newfoundland and Labrador following a Liberal leadership election. Provincial legislation requires a general election to be held no more than one year following a Premier's resignation.
 April 4, 2020 – Service NL Minister Sherry Gambin-Walsh was removed from cabinet as the RCMP launched a criminal investigation into allegations that she leaked cabinet documents.
July 16, 2020 – The Progressive Conservatives begin opening up nominations in anticipation of an upcoming provincial election.
July 21, 2020 – The NL Alliance open nominations in all forty districts.
August 3, 2020 – Andrew Furey is elected leader of the Liberal Party.
August 19, 2020 – Furey is formally sworn in as Premier, along with a new provincial cabinet. MHAs Bennett, Loveless, and Stoodley enter cabinet.
September 7, 2020 – Dwight Ball resigns as MHA for Humber-Gros Morne.
September 9, 2020 – The RCMP disclose that Sherry Gambin-Walsh broke cabinet confidentiality by leaking information to Paul Didham, a senior police officer with the Royal Newfoundland Constabulary. The RCMP did not lay criminal charges against Gambin-Walsh because no one benefited from the information; however Premier Furey did not reappoint her to cabinet.
September 14, 2020 – The Liberals open nominations for a general election.
September 25, 2020 – The New Democratic Party opens nominations for a general election.
October 2, 2020 – At their annual convention, the Progressive Conservatives vote against conducting a review of Ches Crosbie's leadership.
October 6, 2020 – Liberal candidate, Premier Andrew Furey, is elected in the Humber-Gros Morne by-election.

2021

January 15, 2021 – Premier Furey asks Lieutenant Governor Judy Foote to dissolve the House of Assembly for a general provincial election, scheduled for February 13, 2021.
January 17, 2021 – The Progressive Conservatives become the first of the four registered parties to nominate a slate of 40 candidates.
January 21, 2021 – The Liberals become the second of the four registered parties to nominate a slate of 40 candidates.
 January 22, 2021 – NL Alliance leader Graydon Pelley suspends his campaign due to an emergency surgery that left him in an extensive recovery period.
January 23, 2021 – Deadline for candidates to be nominated.
February 2, 2021 – Initial deadline for mail-in ballots to be received.
February 6, 2021 – Advance voting took place.
February 11, 2021 – Following a surge in cases of COVID-19 in St. John's and the surrounding area, Chief Electoral Officer Bruce Chaulk announced that voting in 18 of the province's 40 electoral districts, all in the Avalon Peninsula, would be delayed indefinitely.
February 12, 2021 – In-person voting is entirely canceled province-wide after it was discovered that the new COVID-19 cases were the Variant of Concern 202012/01.
February 13, 2021 – Initial date that the election was to be held.
March 1, 2021 – Original day that mail-in ballots were to be received.
March 5, 2021 – Second deadline that mail-in ballots were to be received.
March 25, 2021 – Deadline that mail-in ballots are to be received.
March 27, 2021 – Preliminary results are to be announced by Elections NL.
March 30, 2021 – Results will officially be tallied, and the victors will be declared elected.

Campaign

Party platforms
At the start of the campaign, incumbent Liberal  Premier Andrew Furey framed the election around the economy, by focusing on the provincial debt, the oil industry, and government spending. There are $55M worth of expenses proposed.

With a similar focus on the economy, PC leader Ches Crosbie emphasized the importance of creating jobs through infrastructure projects, eliminating regulations, and cutting taxes. Meanwhile, NDP leader Alison Coffin centred her priorities on health care and affordable living.

Initial election call and reaction
Prior to the election being called, the provincial government made a series of announcements involving new spending programs and reached agreements with several unions. The timing of these announcements received disapproval from the PCs. The Liberals were also criticized by the PCs and NDP for calling an election during the winter and the COVID-19 pandemic. Both of the opposition parties suggested that the Liberals should have waited until recommendations were made by the premier's economic recovery team, which was scheduled to release an interim report at the end of February and a final report at the end of April. Despite their criticism, the PCs and NDP indicated that they were prepared for the election.

Impact of the COVID-19 pandemic
Due to the COVID-19 pandemic, Elections NL issued lengthy guidelines for candidates, with parties placing a larger emphasis on social media rather than door-to-door canvassing, large rallies or visits to seniors' homes. In order to avoid crowds on election day, Elections NL focused efforts on voting by mail and scheduled the election on a Saturday for the first time in the province's history. Additionally, the Liberals did not allow members of the media on the party's campaign bus, citing "COVID-19 protocols".

Early voting has increased.

Surge in COVID-19 cases during campaign
On February 8, the province confirmed its first case of community spread of COVID-19 since April 2020. Since the deadlines for voting early or by mail had already passed, it raised concerns about if the election should still go ahead as planned. Chief Electoral Officer Bruce Chaulk stated that no provisions existed that allowed people in isolation to vote, and that the election would proceed as intended.

On February 9, PC candidate Damian Follett suspended in-person campaigning after his son tested positive for COVID-19. On February 12, Follett announced that he had tested positive himself. On the same day, PC candidate Rhonda Simms also suspended in-person campaigning after an individual who had visited her headquarters later tested presumptive positive.

On February 10, Elections NL announced that there would be a 'drive-thru' voting option for the increasing number of people who were in self-isolation. However, this option was later scrapped, as it went against a medical advisory which stated that those self-isolating should not leave their property. On February 11, Chief Electoral Officer Bruce Chaulk issued a letter requesting that party leaders meet with Lieutenant Governor Judy Foote to discuss delaying the election. Chaulk announced later that day that in-person voting would be delayed to a later date on the Avalon Peninsula but would go ahead as planned elsewhere. The following day, Chaulk announced that no in-person voting would take place soon after it was confirmed that the recent COVID-19 cases were the Variant of Concern 202012/01.

Withdrawn candidates 
In January 2021, the leader of the Newfoundland and Labrador Alliance Graydon Pelley withdrew his candidacy in Humber-Gros Morne following a medical emergency.

Issues 
There were claims that sexism and misogyny has affected women candidates on the campaign trail.

Target seats 
CBC News identified 5 "must-watch districts";

 Lake Melville
 Labrador West
 Placentia-St. Mary's
 St. Barbe-L'Anse aux Meadows
 Mount Scio

Opposition

Liberal

Opposition

Candidates by district
Names in boldface type represent party leaders.
† represents that the incumbent is not running again.
§ represents that the incumbent was defeated for nomination.
₰ represents that the incumbent ran in another district and lost the nomination
‡ represents that the incumbent is running in a different district.

St. John's

|-
| style="background:whitesmoke;"| Mount Scio46.80% turnout
||
|Sarah Stoodley2,01146.60%
|
|Damian Follett1,15226.70%
|
| Sheilagh O'Leary1,07424.89%
|
|Andrea Newbury (NL Alliance)601.39%Larry Borne (Independent)180.42%
||
|Sarah Stoodley
|-
| style="background:whitesmoke;"|St. John's Centre38.92% turnout
|
|Gemma Hickey1,27733.60%
|
|Robyn LeGrow53314.02%
||
|Jim Dinn1,99152.38%
|
|
||
|Jim Dinn
|-
| style="background:whitesmoke;"|St. John's East-Quidi Vidi50.76% turnout
||
|John Abbott2,44742.95%
|
|Vaughn Hammond85615.03%
|
|Alison Coffin2,39442.02%
|
|
||
| Alison Coffin
|-
| style="background:whitesmoke;"|St. John's West49.14% turnout
||
|Siobhan Coady2,67957.82%
|
|Kristina Ennis1,48432.03%
|
|Brenda Walsh47010.14%
|
|
||
|Siobhan Coady
|-
| style="background:whitesmoke;"|Virginia Waters-Pleasantville56.83% turnout
||
|Bernard Davis3,48159.61%
|
|Victor Lawlor1,22420.96%
|
|Jenn Deon1,13519.43%
|
|
||
|Bernard Davis
|-
|style="background-color:whitesmoke"|Waterford Valley52.78% turnout
||
|Tom Osborne3,59266.79%
|
|Michael Holden1,34825.07%
|
|Peter Young4388.14%
|
|
||
|Tom Osborne
|-
| style="background:whitesmoke;"|Windsor Lake56.68% turnout
||
|John Hogan2,68850.58%
|
|Ches Crosbie2,15440.53%
|
|Tomás Shea4728.88%
|
|
||
|Ches Crosbie
|}

St. John's suburbs

|-
| style="background:whitesmoke;"|Cape St. Francis58.12% turnout
|
|Peter Whittle1,57128.25%
||
|Joedy Wall3,47662.51%
|
|Phyllis Fleming4498.07%
|
|Ryan Lane651.17%
|
|
||
|Kevin Parsons†
|-
| style="background:whitesmoke;"|Conception Bay East – Bell Island50.12% turnout
|
|Lynn Hammond1,89333.08%
||
| David Brazil3,21556.18%
|
|Gavin Will61410.73%
|
|
|
|
||
|David Brazil
|-
| style="background:whitesmoke;"|Conception Bay South55.54% turnout
|
|Shelley Moores1,94136.18%
||
|Barry Petten3,06357.09%
|
|Andrew Lovell2254.19%
|
|Warrick Butler1362.53%
|
|
||
|Barry Petten
|-
| style="background:whitesmoke;"|Mount Pearl North49.64% turnout
||
|Lucy Stoyles2,42846.69%
|
|Jim Lester2,31944.60%
|
|Jennifer McCreath3376.48%
|
|William Neville1162.23%
|
|
||
|Jim Lester
|-
| style="background:whitesmoke;"|Mount Pearl-Southlands54.61% turnout
|
|Karla Hayward1,38623.98%
|
|Cindy Grant79713.79%
|
|Cara Winsor-Hehir1522.63%
|
|
||
|Paul Lane (Independent)3,44559.60%
||
|Paul Lane
|-
| style="background:whitesmoke;"|Topsail-Paradise55.60% turnout
|
|Ken Carter2,52542.08%
||
|Paul Dinn3,03650.59%
|
|Kathleen Burt4407.33%
|
|
|
|
||
|Paul Dinn
|}

Avalon Peninsula

|-
| style="background:whitesmoke;"|Carbonear-Trinity-Bay de Verde51.55% turnout
||
|Steve Crocker3,89267.53%
|
|Frank Butt1,59627.69%
|
|Matthew Smith2614.53%
|
|Edward Thomas Cole (Independent)140.24%
||
|Steve Crocker
|-
| style="background:whitesmoke;"|Ferryland58.69% turnout
|
|Cheryl O’Brien2,69644.13%
||
|Loyola O'Driscoll3,19752.33%
|
|Paul Murphy2163.54%
|
|
||
|Loyola O'Driscoll
|-
| style="background:whitesmoke;"|Harbour Grace-Port de Grave44.35% turnout
||
|Pam Parsons3,40471.09%
|
|Roy Sparkes1,16924.42%
|
|Dion Hynes2154.79%
|
|
||
|Pam Parsons
|-
| style="background:whitesmoke;"|Harbour Main53.70% turnout
|
|George Murphy2,43041.62%
||
|Helen Conway-Ottenheimer3,18054.47%
|
|Anthony Chadwick2283.91%
|
|
||
|Helen Conway-Ottenheimer
|-
| style="background:whitesmoke;"|Placentia-St. Mary's54.29% turnout
||
| Sherry Gambin-Walsh2,55250.85%
|
|Calvin Manning2,33646.54%
|
|
|
|Clem Whittle (NL Alliance)1312.61%
||
|Sherry Gambin-Walsh
|}

Eastern Newfoundland

|-
| style="background:whitesmoke;"|Bonavista40.48% turnout
|
|Christine Gill94425.56%
||
|Craig Pardy2,11757.32%
|
|Timothy Whey701.90%
|
|Neil King (Independent)56215.22%
||
|Craig Pardy
|-
| style="background:whitesmoke;"|Burin-Grand Bank50.54% turnout
||
|Paul Pike2,66659.59%
|
|Fred Dodge1,63936.63%
|
|Alvin Banfield1694.47%
|
|
||
|Carol Anne Haley†
|-
| style="background:whitesmoke;"|Placentia West-Bellevue56.84% turnout
|
|Sam Synard2,30442.21%
||
|Jeff Dwyer2,96554.32%
|
|Carolyn Davis1893.46%
|
|
||
|Jeff Dwyer
|-
| style="background:whitesmoke;"|Terra Nova53.25% turnout
|
|Steve Denty2,32343.56%
||
|Lloyd Parrott2,83753.20%
|
|Anne Marie Anonsen1733.24%
|
|
||
|Lloyd Parrott
|}

Central Newfoundland

|-
| style="background:whitesmoke;"|Baie Verte-Green Bay42.11% turnout
||
|Brian Warr2,14852.06%
|
|Lin Paddock1,98747.94%
|
|
||
|Brian Warr
|-
| style="background:whitesmoke;"|Exploits51.50% turnout
|
|Rodney Mercer2,17845.20%
||
|Pleaman Forsey2,64154.80%
|
|  
||
|Pleaman Forsey
|-
| style="background:whitesmoke;"|Fogo Island-Cape Freels40.74% turnout
||
|Derrick Bragg2,51161.05%
|
|Sue Collins1,50736.64%
|
|Jim Gill952.31%
||
|Derrick Bragg
|-
| style="background:whitesmoke;"|Fortune Bay-Cape La Hune50.99% turnout
||
|Elvis Loveless1,86868.22%
|
|Charlene Walsh78128.52%
|
|Noel Joe893.25%
||
|Elvis Loveless
|-
| style="background:whitesmoke;"|Gander47.85% turnout
||
|John Haggie3,35870.93%
|
|Jamie Harnum1,22825.94%
|
|Dawn Lahey1483.13%
||
|John Haggie
|-
| style="background:whitesmoke;"|Grand Falls-Windsor-Buchans47.75% turnout
|
|Deborah Ball1,77638.47%
||
|Chris Tibbs2,73559.24%
|
|Holly Pike1062.30%
||
|Chris Tibbs
|-
| style="background:whitesmoke;"|Lewisporte-Twillingate41.06% turnout
||
|Derek Bennett2,59362.44%
|
|Rhonda Simms1,56037.56%
|
|
||
|Derek Bennett
|}

Western Newfoundland

|-
| style="background:whitesmoke;"|Burgeo-La Poile33.54% turnout
||
|Andrew Parsons1,99287.10%
|
|Ethan Wheeler-Park23510.28%
|
|Judy Vanta602.62%
|
|
||
|Andrew Parsons
|-
| style="background:whitesmoke;"|Corner Brook38.44% turnout
||
|Gerry Byrne2,59366.54%
|
|Tom Stewart1,30433.46%
|
|
|
|
||
|Gerry Byrne
|-
| style="background:whitesmoke;"|Humber-Gros Morne44.83% turnout
||
|Andrew Furey2,83863.96%
|
|Jim Goudie1,49233.63%
|
|Sheina Lerman1072.41%
|
|
||
|Andrew Furey
|-
|style="background:whitesmoke;"|Humber-Bay of Islands41.00% turnout
|
|Stelman Flynn74117.76%
|
|Robert Marche44410.64%
|
|
||
|Eddie Joyce (Independent)2,98871.60%
||
|Eddie Joyce
|-
| style="background:whitesmoke;"|St. Barbe-L'Anse aux Meadows51.30% turnout
||
|Krista Howell2,36551.17%
|
|Sheila Fitzgerald2,15946.47%
|
|John McClusky380.82%
|
|Ford Mitchelmore (Independent)701.51%
||
|Chris Mitchelmore†
|-
| style="background:whitesmoke;"|St. George's-Humber43.70% turnout
||
|Scott Reid2,42058.54%
|
|Gary Bishop1,47435.66%
|
|Melissa Samms1914.62%
|
|Shane Snook (NL Alliance)491.19%
||
|Scott Reid
|-
| style="background:whitesmoke;"|Stephenville-Port au Port43.41% turnout
|
|Kevin Aylward1,57437.85%
||
|Tony Wakeham2,48159.67%
|
|Jamie Ruby1032.48%
|
|
||
|Tony Wakeham
|}

Labrador

|-
| style="background:whitesmoke;"|Cartwright-L'Anse au Clair35.28% turnout
||
|Lisa Dempster97395.21%
|
|Joshua Nolan494.79%
|
|
|
|
||
|Lisa Dempster
|-
| style="background:whitesmoke;"|Labrador West43.23% turnout
|
|Wayne Button78028.72%
|
|Nick McGrath57721.24%
||
|Jordan Brown1,35950.04%
|
|
||
|Jordan Brown
|-
| style="background:whitesmoke;"|Lake Melville36.39% turnout
|
|Michelle Baikie30613.35%
|
|Shannon Tobin54723.87%
|
|Amy Norman27912.17%
||
|Perry Trimper (Independent)1,14349.83%Andrew Abbass (Independent)170.74%
||
|Perry Trimper
|-
| style="background:whitesmoke;"|Torngat Mountains22.46% turnout
|
|Devon Ryan163.38%
||
|Lela Evans42088.79%
|
|Patricia Johnson-Castle377.82%
|
|
||
|Lela Evans
|}

Notes

Opinion polls
Voting Intentions in Newfoundland and Labrador since the 2019 election

Results 
The Liberals regained their parliamentary majority. The PC and NDP leaders lost their seats in the legislature. On March 31, 2021, Ches Crosbie resigned as PC leader.

NDP leader Coffin filed for a recount in her district. On May 12, 2021, Supreme Court Justice Donald Burrage rejected Coffin's bid for a recount, arguing that there was not sufficient evidence. On October 16, 2021, Coffin lost a leadership review by party members. She later chose to resign on October 19 and was replaced by MHA Jim Dinn as interim leader.

Defeated PC candidates Jim Lester and Sheila Fitzgerald also filed legal challenges to the results in their respective districts. 

The election was noteworthy in the election of 3 independent candidates, the most of any past election.

Incumbent MHAs who were defeated

References

Elections in Newfoundland and Labrador
Newfoundland and Labrador general election
Elections postponed due to the COVID-19 pandemic